Night Shift is Stephen King's first collection of short stories, first published in 1978. In 1980, Night Shift won the Balrog Award for Best Collection, and in 1979 it was nominated as best collection for the Locus Award and the World Fantasy Award.

Contents

Details
The book was published on the heels of The Shining (1977 Doubleday) and is King's fifth published book (including Rage, which was published under the pseudonym of Richard Bachman). Nine of the twenty stories had first appeared in issues of Cavalier Magazine from 1970 to 1975; others were originally published in Penthouse, Cosmopolitan, Gallery, Ubris, and Maine Magazine. The stories "Jerusalem's Lot", "Quitters, Inc.", "The Last Rung on the Ladder", and "The Woman in the Room" appeared for the first time in this collection.

Foreword and introduction
Night Shift is the first book for which King wrote a foreword.  The introduction was written by one of King's favorite authors, John D. MacDonald.

Film, television or theatrical adaptations
With the publication of Night Shift and the rise in King's popularity as a best-selling author, and with the success of Brian De Palma's motion picture adaptation of Carrie (1976), student film makers began submitting requests to King to adapt stories from the collection. King formed a policy he deemed the Dollar Deal, which allowed the students the permission to make an adaptation for $1.

In the 1980s, entrepreneurial film producer Milton Subotsky purchased the rights to six of the stories in this collection to produce feature films and a television anthology based on multiple stories. Although Subotsky was involved with several King adaptations (Cat's Eye, Maximum Overdrive, Sometimes They Come Back, The Lawnmower Man) the television series never happened due to conflicts with the networks' Standards and Practices.

The following film, television, and theatre adaptations are adapted from the stories in Night Shift:

Feature film adaptations
Children of the Corn (1984) Hal Roach Studios, Inc., directed by Fritz Kiersch
Cat's Eye (1985) Dino De Laurentiis Productions/MGM/UA directed by Lewis Teague (featured adaptations of "Quitters Inc." and "The Ledge")
Maximum Overdrive (based on "Trucks") (1986) De Laurentiis Entertainment Group (DEG) directed by Stephen King
Graveyard Shift (1990) Paramount Pictures directed by Ralph S. Singleton
The Mangler (1995) New Line Cinema directed by Tobe Hooper

Television adaptations
Sometimes They Come Back (1991) Vidmark Entertainment directed by Tom McLoughlin, originally attempted to be adapted into Cat's Eye.
Trucks (1997) USA Pictures directed by Chris Thomson
Battleground (2006) Turner Network Television mini-series Nightmares & Dreamscapes
Children of the Corn (2009) a Syfy production
Chapelwaite (2021) based on the short story Jerusalem's Lot

Dollar Baby adaptations (shorts)
The Boogeyman (1982) directed by Jeff Schiro
Disciples of the Crow (based on "Children of the Corn") (1983) directed by John Woodward
The Woman in the Room (1983) directed by Frank Darabont
The Last Rung on the Ladder (1987) directed by James Cole and Daniel Thron
The Lawnmower Man (1987) directed by Jim Gonis
Night Surf (2001) directed by Peter Sullivan
Strawberry Spring (2001) directed by Doveed Linder
I Know What You Need (2004) directed by Shawn S. Lealos
La Femme dans la chambre (The Woman in the Room) (2005) directed by Damien Maric
The Boogeyman (play) (2005) by Graham Rees (60 minutes)

Other
The Lawnmower Man (1992) New Line Cinema directed by Brett Leonard - an unrelated film named in tribute to the story of the same name contained within this anthology.

See also

Stephen King short fiction bibliography
Dollar Baby

References

1978 short story collections
American short story collections
Short story collections by Stephen King
Doubleday (publisher) books
English-language books